Seacliff is an unincorporated community in Santa Cruz County, California, United States that includes Seacliff State Beach. It is identified as one of several small communities with a combined population of 24,402 forming the unincorporated town of Aptos by the local Chamber of Commerce along with:
 Aptos Hills-Larkin Valley, a rural area north of State Route 1
 Cabrillo
 Rio Del Mar, south of State Route 1, from Aptos Creek southeast to Seascape
 Seascape, south of State Route 1, centered on Seascape Beach Resort

For statistical purposes, the United States Census Bureau has defined Seacliff as a census-designated place (CDP). The census definition of the area may not precisely correspond to local understanding of the area with the same name. The 2010 United States census reported Seacliff's population was 3,267.

Geography
According to the United States Census Bureau, the CDP covers an area of 0.8 square miles (2.0 km), 99.90% of it land and 0.10% of it water. The 2010 United States census reported Seacliff's population was 3,267.

Demographics
The 2010 United States Census reported that Seacliff had a population of 3,267. The racial makeup of Seacliff was 2,758 (84.4%) White, 28 (0.9%) African American, 40 (1.2%) Native American, 100 (3.1%) Asian, 4 (0.1%) Pacific Islander, 189 (5.8%) from other races, and 148 (4.5%) from two or more races. Hispanic or Latino of any race were 482 persons (14.8%).

The Census reported that 3,267 people (100% of the population) lived in households, 0 (0%) lived in non-institutionalized group quarters, and 0 (0%) were institutionalized.

There were 1,536 households, out of which 354 (23.0%) had children under the age of 18 living in them, 551 (35.9%) were opposite-sex married couples living together, 184 (12.0%) had a female householder with no husband present, 76 (4.9%) had a male householder with no wife present.  There were 135 (8.8%) unmarried opposite-sex partnerships, and 34 (2.2%) same-sex married couples or partnerships. 504 households (32.8%) were made up of individuals, and 142 (9.2%) had someone living alone who was 65 years of age or older. The average household size was 2.13.  There were 811 families (52.8% of all households); the average family size was 2.67.

The population was spread out, with 553 people (16.9%) under the age of 18, 279 people (8.5%) aged 18 to 24, 868 people (26.6%) aged 25 to 44, 1,150 people (35.2%) aged 45 to 64, and 417 people (12.8%) who were 65 years of age or older.  The median age was 43.8 years. For every 100 females, there were 90.5 males.  For every 100 females age 18 and over, there were 87.7 males.

The homeowner vacancy rate was 1.6%; the rental vacancy rate was 2.5%.  1,614 people (49.4% of the population) lived in owner-occupied housing units and 1,653 people (50.6%) lived in rental housing units.

References

Census-designated places in Santa Cruz County, California
Aptos, California
Census-designated places in California